Anapausa longipennis is a species of beetle in the family Cerambycidae. It was described by Stephan von Breuning in 1966. It is known from New Guinea.

References

Homonoeini
Beetles described in 1966